Rory Brennan  (born 1945) is an Irish poet, born in Westport, County Mayo. He has worked as a lecturer in Communications at Dublin City University Business School; and also as a presenter and programme-maker in the Education Department of RTÉ Radio. He was Secretary (Director) of Poetry Ireland in the 1980s.

Poetry Books
Dancing with Luck, The American University Paris, 2016
Sky Lights, Luces Del Cielo, The Aegean Centre Press,  2012
The Wind Messages, A chapbook, 1986
The Old in Rapallo, Salmon Press, 1997.
The Walking Wounded, Dedalus Press, 1985.
The Sea on Fire, Dolmen Press, 1978

External links
http://www.rorybrennanpoet.com
http://www.irishwriters-online.com/rorybrennan.html
http://www.dcu.ie/info/staff_member.php?id_no=180

1945 births
Irish poets
Living people
People from County Mayo
Alumni of St Patrick's College, Maynooth
Alumni of Trinity College Dublin